Ayteke Bi is a district of Aktobe Region in Kazakhstan. The administrative center of the district is the selo of Komsomol. Population:

Geography
Ayke lake is located in the district at the Kazakhstan–Russia border.

References

Districts of Kazakhstan
Aktobe Region